Drakesburg is an unincorporated community in Portage County, in the U.S. state of Ohio. It is located in Freedom Township at the intersection of Nichols Road and state routes 303 and 88.

History
The community derives its name from Orsamus Drake, the proprietor of a local tavern.

References

Unincorporated communities in Portage County, Ohio
Unincorporated communities in Ohio